Cove is a city in Union County, Oregon, United States. The population was 620 at the 2020 census.

History
This area was well known to the Cayuse and Nez Perce Tribes who referred to it as Wiweeletitpe (wee-walla-tit-puh), meaning "Many creeks flowing at that place". Euro-Americans first settled here in 1862, and in 1863 they established a post office named Forest Cove. Samuel G. French was the first postmaster. To avoid confusion between Forest Cove and another Oregon community, Forest Grove in Washington County, post office authorities changed the name to Cove in 1868. Cove was platted in the 1870s along Ruckles Road, only the second road over the Blue Mountains.

Geography
Cove lies east of La Grande and north of Union along the eastern edge of the Grande Ronde Valley of northeastern Oregon. Mill Creek, a tributary of the Grande Ronde River, flows west from the Wallowa Mountains through Cove.

Oregon Route 237 passes through Cove.

Climate
This region experiences warm (but not hot) and dry summers, with no average monthly temperatures above . According to the Köppen Climate Classification system, Cove has a warm-summer Mediterranean climate, abbreviated "Csb" on climate maps.

Demographics

2010 census
As of the census of 2010, there were 552 people, 240 households, and 161 families residing in the city. The racial makeup of the city was 91.1% White, 0.7% Native American, 1.6% Asian, 0.2% Pacific Islander, 1.6% from other races, and 4.7% from two or more races. Hispanic or Latino of any race were 3.6% of the population.

There were 240 households, of which 28.3% had children under the age of 18 living with them, 56.7% were married couples living together, 7.9% had a female householder with no husband present, 2.5% had a male householder with no wife present, and 32.9% were non-families. 30.0% of all households were made up of individuals, and 14.6% had someone living alone who was 65 years of age or older. The average household size was 2.30 and the average family size was 2.75.

The median age in the city was 50 years. 22.1% of residents were under the age of 18; 3.4% were between the ages of 18 and 24; 17.6% were from 25 to 44; 33.7% were from 45 to 64; and 23.2% were 65 years of age or older. The gender makeup of the city was 48.9% male and 51.1% female.

2000 census
As of the census of 2000, there were 594 people, 231 households, and 176 families residing in the city. The population density was 732.9 people per square mile (283.1/km). There were 247 housing units at an average density of 304.8 per square mile (117.7/km). The racial makeup of the city was 95.45% White, 0.17% African American, 1.35% Native American, 0.17% Asian, 0.34% Pacific Islander, 1.85% from other races, and 0.67% from two or more races. Hispanic or Latino of any race were 2.19% of the population.

There were 231 households, out of which 31.2% had children under the age of 18 living with them, 65.8% were married couples living together, 8.7% had a female householder with no husband present, and 23.4% were non-families. 21.2% of all households were made up of individuals, and 12.1% had someone living alone who was 65 years of age or older. The average household size was 2.57 and the average family size was 2.94.

In the city, the population was spread out, with 26.1% under the age of 18, 6.1% from 18 to 24, 23.1% from 25 to 44, 27.6% from 45 to 64, and 17.2% who were 65 years of age or older. The median age was 42 years. For every 100 females, there were 89.2 males. For every 100 females age 18 and over, there were 88.4 males.

The median income for a household in the city was $38,542, and the median income for a family was $42,344. Males had a median income of $31,793 versus $24,063 for females. The per capita income for the city was $15,872. About 11.1% of families and 12.9% of the population were below the poverty line, including 16.3% of those under age 18 and 8.0% of those age 65 or over.

Education
Cove is served by the Cove School District which is a K-12 public charter school that includes Cove High School. Cove High School participates in the 1A Old Oregon League in the OSAA.

Parks and recreation
Cove Hot Springs Pool is a natural warm-water swimming pool.

Notable people
 Greg Barreto, former state representative
 Frank E. Childs, thoroughbred trainer in Racing Hall of Fame, born in Cove
 Lee Morse, torch singer of the 1920s and '30s, born in Cove
 Dean Smith, pioneer airmail pilot

References

External links

Entry for Cove in the Oregon Blue Book
Cove community website
City of Cove website

Cities in Oregon
Cities in Union County, Oregon
1870s establishments in Oregon